Farsi Jan or Farsijan may refer to:
 Farsijan, Fars
 Farsi Jan, Markazi